Vijay Lama, also known as Captain Vijay Lama :  a senior Nepali pilot:one of the first Nepalese pilots to become the instructor on Airbus A330 is  singer, actor, television presenter, and social activist.

Acting career 
He has worked in more than 30 Nepali movies such as Raanko, and Truck Driver. His debut movie was the Nepali film Aadarsha Naari (1984). He appeared in the Hollywood film Everest featuring an ensemble cast including Josh Brolin and Jake Gyllenhaal. He played the role of rescue pilot Col. Madan KC. Vijaya Lama also participated as a solo singer in Melancholy song by 365 Nepali Artists which set the Guinness World Record for "Most Vocal Solos in a Song Recording".

Filmography
Aadarsha Nari (1985)
Truck Driver (1994)
Muna Madan (2003)
Everest (2015)
Bobby   (2018 film)

References

Living people
1964 births
People from Lalitpur District, Nepal
Nepalese actors
20th-century Nepalese male singers
Nepalese television personalities
21st-century Nepalese male singers
Nepalese aviators